Coventry Copsewood F.C. are a football club based in Coventry, West Midlands, England. In 2005, they changed their name from Coventry Marconi to their present name.

History

Name
The club was formed in 1922 by employees of Peel Connor, and was known as the 'Connor'.  They played in the Coventry District League until 1926 when due to an amalgamation with Magnito Ltd, they were renamed Magnet FC.  They continued playing under this name until 1934 when they changed again to GEC (Cov) FC.  This name stuck for longer, lasting until the 1970s when they became GPT (Coventry) FC, and then changed again in 1999 to Marconi (Coventry) FC, and then when Marconi sold off their land in 2006, it became Coventry Copsewood FC.

On the pitch
During its early years, the team played in the District and Works League, and had large success in the post war years, and then again in the 1970s when they won their league's internal cup four times, the Coventry Evening Telegraph Cup three years running and the Birmingham Junior Cup twice. In 1993 the club applied to join the Midland Football Combination. They finished 5th in each of their first five years in Division Two, but gained promotion due to their facilities.  In the 1996–97 season they did the double in Division One, and were promoted to the Premier Division, where they currently play.

In the early part of the 21st century manager Paul Mills led the club to several finishes near the top of the table, and qualification to the later stages of their cup competitions, being runners up in the Telegraph Cup twice, winning the Coventry Charity Cup three times and winning the Tony Allden Cup.  Since then, with the departure of Mills, they underwent a rebuilding process and finished mid-table in 2005–06, but slipped to near the bottom of the division in 2006–07.  In 2008–09 they reached the final of the Coventry Telegraph Cup, losing to local rivals Nuneaton Griff on penalties at the Ricoh Arena.  They also had an improved finish in the Midland Combination, finishing ninth. The reserve side were crowned champions of Coventry Alliance Two for 2008–09. They also have the 3rd highest number of teams entered in the Coventry Minor league with 18 teams ranging from u-7 to u-16.

Ground
The team play their home games at Allard Way, which is often used for local cup finals. Although around the pitch there is one small stand and a small covered shelter behind one goal. The team do have a large (for their level of football) two storey club house which they share with the other sports clubs which together make up the Copsewood Sports and Social Club.

Seasons

 Coventry Copsewood deducted 1 point for fielding an ineligible player.
 Coventry Copsewood deducted 1 point for fielding an ineligible player.

Honours
Midland Football Combination Premier Division Runners Up (1 time):
2002–03
Midland Combination Division One Champions (1 time):
1996–97
Best FA Vase run: 2nd round, 2001–02, 2010–11,2016-17

Sources

References

External links
Official website
Pyramid Passion feature on their ground
Ladies team

Football clubs in England
Midland Football Combination
Association football clubs established in 1922
Sport in Coventry
1922 establishments in England
Football clubs in the West Midlands (county)
Midland Football League
Coventry Alliance Football League
Works association football teams in England